Uracentron is a genus of tropidurid lizards found in forests in northern South America. It contains only two species, which are both arboreal, have a relatively short spiny tail, and mainly feed on ants.

Species
Uracentron azureum (Linnaeus, 1758) – green thornytail iguana
Uracentron flaviceps (Guichenot, 1855) – tropical thornytail iguana

References

Uracentron
Lizard genera
Taxa named by Johann Jakob Kaup